Csongrád (Hungarian: Csongrád, Serbian: Čongrad or Чонград) was an administrative county (comitatus) of the Kingdom of Hungary. Its territory, which was smaller than that of present-day Csongrád-Csanád County, is now part of Hungary, except a very small area which belongs to Serbia. The capital of the county was Szentes.

Name

The name Csongrád/Čongrad is Slavic by origin. In Slavic languages, this name means "a black city" (čon/čorni = black, grad = city/town). Indeed, the county was named after a town of Csongrád.

Geography

Csongrád county shared borders with the Hungarian counties Pest-Pilis-Solt-Kiskun, Jász-Nagykun-Szolnok, Békés, Csanád, Torontál and Bács-Bodrog. The river Tisza flowed through the county. Its area was 3,544 km2 around 1910.

History

Csongrád county arose in the 11th century as one of the first counties of the Kingdom of Hungary. It was taken by the Ottoman Empire in the 16th century, and reconquered by the Habsburg Kingdom of Hungary at the end of the 17th century.

In 1920, the Treaty of Trianon assigned a small part of the territory of the county - a small area around Horgos (now Horgoš, Vojvodina) in northern Délvidék - to the Kingdom of Serbs, Croats and Slovenes (renamed to Yugoslavia in 1929). The rest remained in Hungary. During World War II, Hungary annexed the territory lost, but after the end of the war the previous borders were restored.

In 1950, the southern part of Csanád County (which contained then the Hungarian part of the pre-1920 Torontál County and the south-western part of the pre-1920 Csanád County) was added to Csongrád county, which was however renamed to Csongrád-Csanád County on 4 June 2020.

Demographics

Subdivisions
In the early 20th century, the subdivisions of Csongrád county were:

Notes

References 

States and territories established in 1715
States and territories established in 1790
States and territories disestablished in 1552
1786 disestablishments
States and territories disestablished in 1920
States and territories disestablished in 1946
Counties in the Kingdom of Hungary
Vojvodina under Habsburg rule